Bobby Dean Howry (born August 4, 1973) is an American former professional baseball relief pitcher.

Early life
Howry attended, and played baseball at Deer Valley High School in Arizona, then he attended McNeese State University and was drafted by the San Francisco Giants in the fifth round of the 1994 Major League Baseball Draft.

Baseball career
During the  season, Howry was one of six prospects (along with Keith Foulke, Lorenzo Barceló, Mike Caruso, Ken Vining, and Brian Manning) traded to the White Sox in exchange for Wilson Álvarez, Danny Darwin, and Roberto Hernández in what became known as the White Flag Trade.

In a year and a half with the Indians, Howry posted an 11–6 record with 87 strikeouts and a 2.61 ERA.

In late , Howry signed a three-year, $12 million deal with the Chicago Cubs. Facing the Colorado Rockies on June 24, 2007, he gave up a three-run home run to Troy Tulowitzki in the ninth that capped a six-run comeback to put the Rockies ahead 9–8. After the home run, a fan ran on the field, getting tackled as he neared the pitcher's mound. According to Howry, the fan asked him, "What are you doing?" "I'm trying to give up home runs, what do you think?" Howry responded. The Cubs won 10–9 on a two-RBI single by Alfonso Soriano in the bottom of the inning.

He is one of four pitchers who have pitched in at least 70 games each of the four seasons from 2004–08, the others being Scott Schoeneweis (who has done so for five seasons), Chad Qualls, and Dan Wheeler.

After the Cubs declined arbitration, Howry signed a $2.75 million, one-year contract with the San Francisco Giants on December 3, 2008.

On December 28, 2009, Howry signed a one-year deal with the Arizona Diamondbacks with a club option for 2011.

On May 17, 2010, he was released by the Arizona Diamondbacks to make room for recently acquired Saul Rivera.

On May 21, Howry re-signed with the Cubs.

On July 30, 2010, the Cubs released Howry. During his brief return to the Cubs in 2010, he was 0–3 with a 5.66 ERA in 24 relief appearances. Howry was released to make room for pitcher Carlos Zambrano, who was returning to the team from suspension.

On February 27, 2011, Howry retired.

References

External links

1973 births
Living people
American expatriate baseball players in Canada
Arizona Diamondbacks players
Baseball players from Phoenix, Arizona
Birmingham Barons players
Boston Red Sox players
Buffalo Bisons (minor league) players
Calgary Cannons players
Chicago White Sox players
Cleveland Indians players
Clinton LumberKings players
Chicago Cubs players
Everett Giants players
Major League Baseball pitchers
McNeese Cowboys baseball players
Pawtucket Red Sox players
San Francisco Giants players
San Jose Giants players
Shreveport Captains players
Yavapai Roughriders baseball players